The Canada–Philippines relations refers to the diplomatic relations between Canada and the Philippines.

Diplomatic mission
Canada has a resident embassy in Manila while the Philippines has a resident embassy in Ottawa.

The Philippines also maintains consulates general in Calgary, Toronto, and Vancouver, as well as honorary consulates in Edmonton, Winnipeg, St. John's, Halifax and Charlottetown.

Trade 
In 2012, Canadian exports to the Philippines were (CAD) $527.9 million, while exports to Canada from the Philippines were valued at $991.2 million.  From 2013–19, the Canada–Philippines waste dispute was a point of trade contention between the two nations.

State visits

Former Canadian Prime Minister Jean Chrétien, together with a business delegate, visited the Philippines in 1997. Canadian Prime Minister Stephen Harper also paid a state visit to the Philippines from November 9–11, 2012. Philippine President Benigno Aquino III paid a state visit to Canada from May 7–9, 2015.

Cultural relations
From 2006 to 2011, Tagalog became the fastest-growing language in Canada.

Filipinos in Canada

As of 2016, there are more than 850,000 people, of Filipino origin in Canada. Filipinos account for the majority of incoming immigrants to Canada. The Philippines has also become the largest source of temporary workers. Filipinos are the third largest minority in Canada, behind Indians and the Chinese.

Canadians in the Philippines
As of 2013, there are about 7,500 Canadians in the Philippines.

References

 
Bilateral relations of the Philippines
Philippines